The 46° Targa Florio was a motor race which took place on 6 May 1962, on the Circuito Piccolo delle Madonie, Sicily, Italy. Ferraris placed first and second, with a Porsche finishing third. The race was part of the World Sportscar Championship as well as the Grand Touring championship.

Race

Ferrari dominated most of the 1962 race, with a double victory for the team cars and with two privateers finishing fourth and fifth. Ferrari won both the sports car and the GT trophies, with Porsche winning the under two-liter GT category with a Carrera 1600. Porsche were trying out a new version of the 718, combining the two-litre boxer-eight (developed from the 1.5 litre engine used in the Formula 1 car, and also seen in testing for Le Mans 1961) with the new coupé bodywork which had thus far only been used with a four-cylinder engine. Worried about reliability, they had Count Volpi's Scuderia SSS Republica di Venezia enter the two cars instead, which is why they were painted red. The second car was driven by Graham Hill and Dan Gurney, but the latter crashed it after a brake failure. The third-placed car also had brake problems as Porsche were still coming to grips with disc brakes.

Official Classification

Class Winners are in Bold text.

References

Targa Florio
Targa Florio
Targa Florio